The Foot Hills State Forest is a state forest located in Cass and Hubbard counties, Minnesota. The forest is a popular recreation spot due to its proximity to the greater Minneapolis – Saint Paul metropolitan area.

History and overview
At the turn of the twentieth century the land where the forest is now located, along with the majority of Minnesota, was logged and opened to homesteading, however the area proved to be unsuitable for agriculture. Many homesteads were abandoned after the old-growth forests were logged and the logging companies ceased the upkeep of their railroads, making the homesteads isolated. With the elimination of the red pine and eastern white pine that originally dominated the landscape, secondary successional species such as the northern hardwoods (aspen, red maple, paper birch, and sugar maple), red oak, and bur oak, established and are now the principal tree species in the forest.

Recreation
The hundreds of small lakes and potholes in the forest, formed during the Wisconsin glaciation, make boating, swimming, canoeing, and kayaking popular recreation activities. They also make the forest an attraction for many bird and waterfowl species. Rookeries for the great blue heron are present in the forest, as are mallards and wood ducks. North American beavers also use the abundance of aspen in the forest to build dens.

Other outdoor recreational activities include hiking and mountain biking on provided trails, as well as backcountry camping. Trails include  available for Class I and II all-terrain vehicle use as well as dirt biking, and  designated for other off-road vehicles.  are also designated for cross-country skiing.

See also
List of Minnesota state forests

External links
Foot Hills State Forest - Minnesota Department of Natural Resources (DNR)
Spider Lake OHV Trails

References

Minnesota state forests
Protected areas of Cass County, Minnesota
Protected areas of Hubbard County, Minnesota
Protected areas established in 1931